WordLift is a start-up founded in 2017 and based in Rome, Italy. The company developed the WordPress plugin  of the same name, which, through the use of semantic technologies and artificial intelligence, optimises the writing and organisation of content and the findability of websites.

Wordlift supports 32 different languages and in 2017 has had over 200 clients, amongst which are SalzburgerLand Tourismus GmbH, Greenpeace, Legambiente and The American University in Cairo.

History
WordLift was founded in  Rome in 2017 by Andrea Volpini, David Riccitelli, and other partners, and its plugin was developed using the results of European Union's research and development projects Interactive Knowledge Stack (IKS) and Media in Context (MICO). Both projects were co-funded by the European Union and aimed at developing open source semantic technologies.

WordLift aids content writing on the web by enriching it with structured metadata that increases the PageRank of website pages. In March 2017 WordLift has created a partnership with WooRank, a Belgian a company specialising in digital marketing, thus obtaining a 200.000 euro grant.

Awards
In 2011 WordLift took part and the IKS Semantics UX Contest winning 40.000 euros.

In 2020 WordLift, together with its partners Redlink GmbH, SalzburgerLand Tourismus GmbH and the Semantic Technology Institute at the University of Innsbruck, Austria, has received funding support from European Union to develop a new project that will make available the tool's Agentive SEO technology for any Content Management System.

The project, called WordLift Next Generation, received the financial support of Eurostars Horizon 2020, a program promoted by the European Union that supports research activities and innovative small and medium-sized enterprises.

See also
 Semantic web
 Search engine optimisation
 Linked data
 Natural-language processing

References

External links
Official Website

Blog software
Semantic Web companies
Content management systems
Free software programmed in PHP
WordPress
Website management
Italian companies established in 2017